The Great Western Railway (GWR) 7200 Class is a class of 2-8-2T steam locomotive.  They were the only 2-8-2Ts built and used by a British railway, and the largest tank engines to run on the Great Western Railway.

Rebuild and operation 
Originally, the 4200 class and 5205 class 2-8-0T were introduced for short-haul Welsh coal traffic, but the Stock Market Crash of 1929 saw coal traffic dramatically fall. Built specifically for the short runs of heavy trains in the South Wales Coalfield, Charles Collett took the agreed decision to rebuild some of them with an extended coal carrying capacity and thus greater range and usefulness by adding  to the frames, requiring the addition of a trailing wheel set, making them 2-8-2T.

With the work carried out at Swindon Works, the first to be converted was 5275 (lot 266), which returned to traffic numbered 7200 in August 1934. An official photograph of the prototype was taken on 27 July 1934 at the usual site outside 'A Shop' for engine pictures. Nos. 5276–5294 were similarly rebuilt between August and November 1934, becoming 7201–7219, and Nos. 7220–7239 were rebuilt from 5255–5274 between August 1935 and February 1936; with both batches, the rebuilding was not in numerical order, but the new numbers were in the same sequence as the old. Nos. 7240–7253, rebuilt August 1937–December 1939, were selected at random from locomotives numbered in the 4200 series. This last batch of conversions had been authorised on Lot 318.

The final batch of the class were later fitted with newly developed 'Coal Scuttle' bunkers. These bunkers consisted of a higher rivet line increasing the water capacity up to a total of 2,700 gallons allowing the locos to travel longer distances. The bunker was also designed to facilitate the movement of the coal towards the hatch in the cab, however ‘scuttle bunkers’ would only carry 5 tonnes of coal instead of 6. No. 7200 is the only surviving loco of the class to carry one of these unique bunkers.

The 54 rebuilt locos found work in most parts of the GWR system, where their great weight  was allowed, although the rebuilt chassis length did get them banned from certain goods yards. Many found work in the home counties, deployed on iron ore and stone trains from Banbury.

On 17 May 1941 No. 7238 ran into a bomb crater.

Withdrawal 
The first member of the class to be withdrawn was number 7241 in November 1962, whilst the last four engines in traffic served until June 1965. Four of the class were bought by Woodham Brothers scrapyard in Barry, Vale of Glamorgan, and No. 7226 was scrapped there in 1965.

Preservation 
Three locomotives survive, all recovered from Woodham Brothers, though none have yet been returned to operational condition. However, in November of 2020, the Buckinghamshire Railway Centre announced that a major milestone was reached with No. 7200.

Models
In 2012, Hornby released models of the 7200 class in both the original GWR green and BR black.

See also 
 List of GWR standard classes with two outside cylinders

References

External links 

 Great Western Archive – 7200 Class
 The 7200 Trust - Restoring 7200

2-8-2T locomotives
7200 Class
Railway locomotives introduced in 1934
Freight locomotives
Standard gauge steam locomotives of Great Britain
1′D1′ h2t locomotives